The 87th Pennsylvania House of Representatives District is located in central Pennsylvania and has been represented by Thomas Kutz since 2023.

District profile
The 87th District is located in Cumberland County and includes the following areas: 

Lower Allen Township (part)
Precinct 02
Monroe Township
Mount Holly Springs
Silver Spring Township
South Middleton Township (part)
Precinct 01 
Precinct 02 
Precinct 06 
Precinct 07 
Precinct 08 
Precinct 09
Upper Allen Township

Representatives

References

Government of Cumberland County, Pennsylvania
87